Ficus angladei is a critically endangered species of plant in the family Moraceae. It is endemic to the Palani Hills of Tamil Nadu, India.

References

angladei
Endemic flora of India (region)
Flora of Tamil Nadu
Critically endangered flora of Asia
Taxonomy articles created by Polbot